The following is an outline of 1984 in spaceflight.

Launches

|colspan="8"|

January 
|-

|colspan="8"|

February 
|-

|colspan="8"|

March 
|-

|colspan="8"|

April 
|-

|colspan="8"|

May 
|-

|colspan="8"|

June 
|-

|colspan="8"|

July 
|-

|colspan="8"|

August 
|-

|colspan="8"|

September 
|-

|colspan="8"|

October 
|-

|colspan="8"|

November 
|-

|colspan="8"|

December 
|-

|}

Deep-space rendezvous
There were no deep-space rendezvous in 1984.

EVAs

References

Footnotes

 
Spaceflight by year